Bressingham is a village and civil parish in the English county of Norfolk.

History
The name Bressingham is of Old English origin and refers to the homestead of Briosa's people.

Bressingham is mentioned in the Domesday Book as consisting of 47 households, which placed it in the largest 20% of settlements in 1086. At this time, Bressingham was divided between the land of William I (2 acres of meadow, 6 pigs and woodland) and Bury St Edmunds Abbey (16 acres of meadow, 26 pigs and woodland).

Bressingham's St. John the Baptist Church was built in the Perpendicular Gothic Style in the 15th century, yet features of the interior, specifically the chancel, date back to the 14th century. The stained glass windows depict St. Peter, St. Paul, John the Baptist and Christ, and were installed by J & J King of Norwich in 1877.

From 1804, Bressingham had a thriving Amicable Society with upwards of thirty members agreeing to a rudimentary form of life insurance. The society conducted its meetings in the Chequers pub.

Governance
Bressingham is part of the electoral ward of Bressingham & Burston for local elections and is classified as a district of South Norfolk.

Bressingham's national constituency is South Norfolk and has been represented by Richard Bacon MP at Parliament since 2001. 

The population of the ward at the 2011 census was 2,810.

Points of interest
 War Memorial, at the junction between School Road and High Road
 Bressingham Steam and Gardens
 Village Shop & Post Office, High Road
 St John the Baptist Church, Church Lane
 Bressingham Methodist Church, High Road- completed in 1900
 Bressingham Village Hall & Playing Fields, High Road
 Chequers Pub

War Memorial
The Bressingham Parish War Memorial is found on the junction between School Road and High Road. It commemorates the following individuals who died in the First World War: 
 Private Harry Flatman (1880–1918), 20th (Football) Battalion, Middlesex Regiment
 Private John Fortis (1879–1917), 1st Battalion, Royal Norfolk Regiment
 George Garland
 Rifleman Thomas E. Goodswen (1894–1918), 8th (Post Office) Battalion, London Regiment
 Private George H. Hall (1898–1915), 3rd Battalion, Royal Norfolk Regiment
 Corporal George H. Hoskins (1876–1919), 144th Siege, Royal Garrison Artillery
 Private Herbert C. Kent, 2nd Battalion, Cheshire Regiment
 Private William R. Leighton, 9th Battalion, Royal Norfolk Regiment
 Sergeant Charles W. Parsley, 9th Battalion, Royal Norfolk Regiment
 Private Victor J. M. Rawlinson, 9th Battalion, Gloucestershire Regiment
 Private Frank V. Rodwell, 7th Battalion, Royal Norfolk Regiment
 Private John H. Rolfe, 7th Battalion, Royal Norfolk Regiment

References

External links
bressinghamandfersfield.org The website of Bressingham and Fersfield's Parish Council

Villages in Norfolk
Civil parishes in Norfolk